Kanske en gentleman may refer to:
 Kanske en gentleman (1935 film) (Perhaps a Gentleman), a Swedish drama film
 Perhaps a Gentleman (1950 film) (Kanske en gentleman), a Swedish comedy film